Established in 1996, Bioscientifica Ltd is the commercial subsidiary of the Society for Endocrinology, and provides publishing, events, and association management services to biomedical societies, and to the pharmaceutical industry. Although the company generates profits, these are redistributed to Bioscientifica's partner societies to fund biomedical research and practice.

Publishing 
Bioscientifica publishes academic journals and case reports focused on endocrinology, and its intersecting disciplines. The company also publishes free-to-read conference abstracts via its BiosciAbstracts platform and conference proceedings via Bioscientifica Proceedings. According to the 2016 Journal Citation Reports, six of Bioscientifica's publications have an impact factor: Endocrine-Related Cancer, Journal of Endocrinology, Journal of Molecular Endocrinology, European Journal of Endocrinology, Reproduction (journal) and Endocrine Connections.

Bioscientifica was an early proponent of open access. In February 2012, the company was among the first 24 publishers to sign the STM Association's Sustainable Open Access Statement. Bioscientifica currently publishes four open access journals, supports gold open access publication in its subscription journals, and makes all journal content free to read online 12 months after publication.

As part of its charitable remit, Bioscientifica participates in the HINARI programme, through which the publisher provides free access to its journals in developing countries.

Event Management 
Bioscientifica manages academic conferences for biomedical societies. Their event services include:

 Scientific and social programme management
 Accommodation management
 Abstract management and publication
 Event marketing and press
 Conference websites and mobile apps
 Coordination of grants and awards
 Liaison with CPD accreditors
 Sponsorship and exhibition sales
 Budget management and bookkeeping

Several of the events managed by Bioscientifica have won industry awards. Recent awards include:

 2019: Silver Award for 'Best Operations Team' at the 2019 Conference Awards
 2018: Bronze Award for 'Best Conference by an event agency' at the 2018 Conference Awards
 2015: 'Best Association Conference Outside London' at the Association Excellence Awards.
 2013: 'Best Association Conference' prize at the fourth Annual Conference Awards

Association Management 
Bioscientifica currently provides Association Management and secretariat services to the following societies:
 British Society for Paediatric Endocrinology and Diabetes
 European Society of Endocrinology
 European Society for Paediatric Endocrinology
 Society for Endocrinology
 UK and Ireland Neuroendocrine Tumour Society

Professional Memberships 
Bioscientifica is a member of the following professional bodies:
 Association of British Professional Conference Organisers
 Association of Learned and Professional Society Publishers
 Committee on Publication Ethics
 Independent Scholarly Publishers Group
 International Association of Scientific, Technical, and Medical Publishers
 International Congress and Convention Association

Governance 
Bioscientifica is governed by its board of directors, which is composed of Society for Endocrinology officers, industry professionals, and members of Bioscientifica's executive team. The board is currently made up of the following members.
Chair: Adrian Clark
Eleanor Davies
Dave Fletcher
Jamie Marwick
Barbara McGowan
David Mills
Ian Russell
Kate Sargent
Adrian Stanley

References

External links 
 

Academic publishing companies
Publishing companies established in 1996
Companies based in Bristol
Publishing companies of the United Kingdom